Montia linearis is a species of flowering plant in the family Montiaceae known by the common names narrowleaf miner's lettuce and narrow-leafed montia. It is native to western North America from British Columbia to California to Utah, where it grows in moist to wet areas in a number of habitat types, including forests and meadows, woodlands and grassland. The plant is also known from some areas of the southeastern United States, including Mississippi.

Description
Montia linearis is a slender, branching annual herb growing to about 25 to 30 centimeters in maximum height. The somewhat fleshy linear leaves are alternately arranged and measure up to 10 centimeters in length. The inflorescence bears up to 14 flowers with bases of curving oval green sepals. The petals are roughly half a centimeter long and white or pink-tinged in color.

External links
Jepson Manual Treatment - Montia linearis
Montia linearis - Photo gallery

linearis
Flora of California
Flora of the Western United States
Flora without expected TNC conservation status